Aly Mohamed Ahmed (born 1 January 1989) is an Egyptian footballer who plays as a full back or winger for Egyptian Premier League club ENPPI as well as the Egypt U-20 national team.

International career
Aly currently plays for the Egyptian U-23 national youth team. He led the right flank line in all Egypt's matches the 2009 FIFA U-20 World Cup that was hosted by Egypt from September 25 to October 16.

References

1989 births
Living people
Egyptian footballers
Egypt international footballers
Association football midfielders
People from Asyut